VivoCity is a shopping mall located in the HarbourFront precinct of Bukit Merah, Singapore.

It was designed by the Japanese architect Toyo Ito, and its name is derived from the word vivacity. In December 2016, VivoCity was recognized by Forbes as one of the top shopping malls in Singapore.

History
VivoCity was built on the site of the Expo Gateway and Harbour Pavilion exhibition halls of the former World Trade Centre (now the HarbourFront Centre) in June 2003. It was designed by the renowned Japanese architect Toyo Ito. Mapletree Investments, a subsidiary of Temasek Holdings, is the developer of the S$417 million complex.

Official opening
The shopping mall opened officially on 1 December 2006 after a topping-out ceremony on 18 April and a soft launch on 7 October that year. The official opening included a six-minute fireworks display, a concert by American band String Theory for the general public, and a Stefanie Sun concert at the mall's amphitheatre at the Sky Park on the third floor. The guest of honour of the event was chairman of Temasek Holdings and former cabinet minister S Dhanabalan. During its first month of opening, it attracted 4.2 million visitors, equivalent to the population of Singapore, and attracted 7.28 million visitors in total before the grand opening. The String Theory concert included a giant harp with strings stretching to the third floor of the mall. The concert was held at The Promenade and lasted ten days, from 1 to 10 December. Barricades were put at the boardwalk blocking the front portion of the boardwalk which is facing the Keppel Harbour. CISCO auxiliary police were deployed for the opening, with the food court on the third floor and the whole Sky Park (roof garden) closed to the public for the day. Parts of the car park were closed for the invited guests as well. A giant projection screen was put at the main entrance of the mall; this screen was to show the concert of Stefanie Sun.

Countdown and tenancy changes
VivoCity served as the official venue for the live televised countdown to the new year, instead of Sentosa as in previous years.

The 2007 Countdown, held from 31 December 2006 to 1 January 2007, was held at the rooftop amphitheatre and included performances by well-known homegrown artists from Mediacorp Channel 5 and 8, as well as the Top 11 finalists of the second season of Singapore Idol.

The 2008 Countdown, held from 31 December 2007 to 1 January 2008, which showcased Taufik Batisah, Daren Tan Sze Wei and the Deal Or No Deal girls in addition to artists from Channel 5 and 8. Before the actual countdown party, fans were treated to a 50-minute showcase for the solo and group winners of the Channel 5 talent competition "Live The Dream", as well as performances by the other finalists of that competition.

The 2009 Countdown, from 31 December 2008 to 1 January 2009 was held. This time it was for the artists from Channel 8 and U instead of those from Channel 5. Since then, Channel 5 will hold its Countdown from The Float at Marina Bay. It also held the following countdowns from 2010 to 2013, but since 2013 it was stopped.

In July 2018, VivoCity launched a new Basement 1 extension mall spanning 3,000 square metres, which houses ten brands across fashion, athleisure and lifestyle categories. Notable brands includes FILA, adidas (and adidas Originals), New Era, Weston Corp and Xiaomi. The new B1 extension is accessible via a new escalator lobby, Lobby R, situated right next to the Kopitiam food court.

Giant, Cold Storage and Guardian previously leased a space under Vivomart brand before moving out on 17 February 2019. The space is now occupied by FairPrice Xtra on 16 July 2019.

In January 2019, the library@harbourfront, was also opened, permanently replacing TEMT and briefly replacing Daiso and The Pet Safari, out of which they were closed down by March 2018. library@harbourfront replaces the Bukit Merah Public Library, and it is located at level 3. It is the biggest library to be located within the mall. The name keeps in line with the tourist libraries such as Chinatown, Orchard and Esplanade. Daiso eventually reopened in the mall on 15 January 2020 but as a smaller outlet located at level 2, while The Pet Safari occupies a location adjacent to the library.

Facilities
As one of the venues of the inaugural Singapore Biennale in 2006, several commissioned art pieces from established designers around the world were unveiled in VivoCity. It is the only venue of the Singapore Biennale where the exhibits are permanent. An international student design contest was recently held to find a design for incorporation into the architecture of VivoCity; it received 365 submissions.

There is a car park with a total of 2,179 lots and a loading and unloading bay. The car parks are located in basements 1 and 2 as well as from levels 2 to 7. There is also a Rooftop carpark on top of level 7. Also, there is a coach and tour buses bay in the mall.

An outdoor pedestrian bridge on level 2 (near the Golden Village Cinema) linking to St James Power Station. Additionally air-con walkways also connects to the HarbourFront Centre.

Transportation
The VivoCity terminal station of the Sentosa Express monorail is located on level 3 (next to the Food Republic food court). It was officially opened on 15 January 2007 as Sentosa Station @ VivoCity, and renamed to its current name in April 2019. There is a bus stop in front of VivoCity, connecting it to Resorts World Sentosa. The linkway at basement 2 and level 1 connects to HarbourFront MRT station and HarbourFront Bus Interchange.

References

External links
 

2006 establishments in Singapore
Shopping malls established in 2006
Shopping malls in Singapore
Bukit Merah
Toyo Ito buildings